LX Pantos Co., Ltd. is a global service provider based in Seoul, South Korea. Since its inception in 1977, LX Pantos has evolved from an air freight agent to include all logistics services including: sea freight, air freight, road and rail freight, warehousing, logistics consulting, international express, project cargo, terminal service, and customs clearance.

History

 February 1977: The Company was founded as Pan Korea Ind. Co., Ltd, an Air Cargo Agency.
 October 1992: Registered in the list of Multimodal Transportation Biz. 
 December 1992: Changed Company name to Pan Korea Express Co., Ltd 
 December 1997: Established bonded warehouse 
July 1999: Commenced logistics customs clearance business 
 September 2001: Commenced logistics outsourcing for LG Chemical Overseas 
 September 2001: China Shanghai Shed Corp (FNS/SHA) established (China HQ) 
 January 2002: Commenced logistics outsourcing for LG Electronics Overseas 
 December 2003: Established UK Branch 
 March 2005: Established Russia Branch (HQ in Moscow) 
 April 2005: Commenced outsourcing for China LG Electronics 
 November 2005: Opened Incheon Airport Logistics Center 
 July 2006: Changed Business name to Pantos Logistics Corporation.

Operations
Pantos has roughly 6,600 employees, operating in 40 countries throughout Asia, North and South America, Europe, CIS, the Middle East, and Africa, creating 350 networks. With over 420,000 m2 of warehouse space globally, it serves over 2,500 customers in the electronics, machinery, automotive, chemical, consumer goods, health care, and construction industries. Pantos is the largest logistics company in Korea and the 26th largest company in the world, and it is one of the world's top ten sea freight forwarders by volume. Since 2000, Pantos's size and scope have increased steadily, its revenue having tripled from 2003 to 2009. In 2010, the revenue of Pantos was 3.0 billion USD.

See also
 LG Group

References

External links
 

Logistics companies of South Korea